Golden Gate is a community and census-designated place (CDP) in Collier County, Florida, United States. Golden Gate's boundaries coincide with a  square of significantly higher density development than surrounding areas. The population was 23,961 as recorded in the 2010 census. It is part of the Naples–Marco Island Metropolitan Statistical Area.

Geography

Demographics

2020 census

As of the 2020 United States census, there were 25,321 people, 7,542 households, and 5,869 families residing in the CDP.

2000 census
As of the census of 2000, there were 20,951 people, 6,518 households, and 5,012 families residing in the CDP. The racial makeup of the CDP was 77.00% White, 10.15% African American, 0.38% Native American, 0.71% Asian, 0.12% Pacific Islander, 7.34% from other races, and 4.31% from two or more races. Hispanic or Latino of any race were 37.14% of the population.

There were 6,518 households, out of which 44.6% had children under the age of 18 living with them, 54.6% were married couples living together, 13.7% had a female householder with no husband present, and 23.1% were non-families. 14.6% of all households were made up of individuals, and 3.7% had someone living alone who was 65 years of age or older.  The average household size was 3.21 and the average family size was 3.44.

In the CDP, the population was spread out, with 30.1% under the age of 18, 11.6% from 18 to 24, 36.0% from 25 to 44, 16.1% from 45 to 64, and 6.2% who were 65 years of age or older.  The median age was 30 years. For every 100 females, there were 111.7 males.  For every 100 females age 18 and over, there were 114.0 males.

The median income for a household in the CDP was $42,295, and the median income for a family was $41,774. Males had a median income of $28,630 versus $22,911 for females. The per capita income for the CDP was $15,923.  About 11.4% of families and 14.1% of the population were below the poverty line, including 18.0% of those under age 18 and 9.9% of those age 65 or over.

Public transportation
Golden Gate is served by Collier Area Transit's 3A, 3B, 4, and 10 routes.

References

External links
  Information about Golden Gate

Unincorporated communities in Collier County, Florida
Unincorporated communities in Florida
Census-designated places in Collier County, Florida
Census-designated places in Florida